Mikhail "Mischa" Alexandrovich Zverev (born 22 August 1987) is a German professional tennis player. He achieved a career-high singles ranking of world No. 25 on 24 July 2017.

At the 2017 Australian Open, Zverev defeated world No. 1 Andy Murray in four sets before losing in the quarterfinals to eventual champion Roger Federer. As a qualifier, he has also reached the quarterfinals of both the 2009 Italian Open and the 2016 Shanghai Masters. He is the brother of former world No. 2 and two-time ATP Finals champion Alexander Zverev.

Personal life

Zverev was born in Moscow, USSR but grew up in Hamburg, Germany when his parents emigrated there in 1990. He is the son of former Russian tennis player Alexander Zverev Sr., who is also his coach. Internationally, he represents Germany and resides in Monte Carlo, Monaco. His younger brother, Alexander Zverev, also plays on the tour.

Juniors
Zverev had a very successful junior career, attaining a No. 3 combined world ranking and making the semifinals of the US Open (losing to Andy Murray), as well as the quarterfinals of Roland Garros (losing to Alex Kuznetsov) and the Australian Open (losing to Novak Djokovic) in 2004. In doubles he reached the final of the French Open in the same year.

As a junior, he compiled a 123–50 win–loss record in singles (and 79–33 in doubles).

Professional career

2006
In October 2006, he made his first quarterfinal at ATP level in Bangkok, Thailand, beating former world No. 1 Juan Carlos Ferrero and former world No. 5 Rainer Schüttler before losing to Marat Safin, also a former world No. 1.

2007: Cracking the top 100
He spent all of 2007 inside the top 200 and, in July, made a second quarterfinal in Rhode Island. He then won a Challenger title in August at a tournament held in Istanbul and followed that up with another quarterfinal run at the Bronx Challenger, which saw him crack the top 100 for the first time in his career.

2008: First doubles title
At the 2008 Australian Open, Zverev nearly upset 11th seed Tommy Robredo in the first round. He took the first two sets but went down in five. In June 2008, Zverev managed to secure his first ATP title victory by winning the doubles together with his partner Mikhail Youzhny at the Gerry Weber Open in Halle, Germany.

At the 2008 Wimbledon Championships, Zverev surprisingly reached the third round after wins over Alexander Peya and Juan Carlos Ferrero, but was then forced to retire in his third round match against Stan Wawrinka due to pain in his left thigh.

2009: Italian Open quarterfinal
In May, he reached the quarterfinals of the Italian Open, losing to world No. 2 Roger Federer in straight sets. He later helped Germany reach the final of the ARAG World Team Cup with teammates Nicolas Kiefer, Rainer Schüttler and Philipp Kohlschreiber. At the 2009 Wimbledon Championships, Zverev beat 25th seed Dmitry Tursunov in straight sets. He faced Philipp Petzschner in the second round and lost in five sets. He was nominated by Davis Cup captain Patrik Kühnen for the quarterfinal against Spain in Marbella. He lost his doubles match with Nicolas Kiefer to Feliciano López and Fernando Verdasco in four sets.

2010: First ATP final
Zverev began his comeback at the Brisbane International in January after a right wrist fracture. However, he lost to Australian wildcard Carsten Ball in straight sets. He made his next appearance at the Medibank International in Sydney where he lost in the first round of qualifying. At the 2010 Australian Open, he lost to Łukasz Kubot from Poland in straight sets.

Zverev regained his form at the European indoor tournaments. In Marseille he reached the semifinal, defeating world No. 17 Tommy Robredo along the way. He lost to eventual champion Michaël Llodra. His good form carried on – he went on to win after saving a match point in his first round match in Delray Beach against Michael Russell before falling to Mardy Fish in two sets. He lost his opening match in Indian Wells. At the 2010 Sony Ericsson Open in Miami, Zverev was knocked out in the first round of qualifying. He would not win a main draw match in a tournament for the next seven weeks.
In preparation for Wimbledon he accepted a Wildcard into the 2010 Gerry Weber Open where he defeated Florent Serra and Jürgen Melzer before falling to Benjamin Becker.
Again, Zverev seemed to have found some form, but he was defeated by Andre Begemann in the first round of qualifying at Wimbledon.
Zverev then decided to enter more ATP Challenger Tour events and reached the quarterfinals of the Oberstaufen Challenger.
Despite being granted a wildcard into both Stuttgart and Hamburg, he could not manage to win more than one match.

At the 2010 US Open, Zverev was defeated in the first round of qualifying again.
He then returned to Europe playing a clay court ATP Challenger Tour Event in Genoa. He reached the quarter-finals where he was defeated by eventual champion Fabio Fognini.
Two weeks later he managed to qualify for the Open de Moselle in Metz. Zverev reached his maiden ATP World Tour singles final after victories over Horacio Zeballos, Nicolas Mahut, Jarkko Nieminen and the retirement of Richard Gasquet in the semifinals. In the final Zverev played Gilles Simon to whom he lost in two sets.
He qualified for the main draw of the ATP World Tour Masters 1000 tournament in Shanghai. In the main draw he lost to Juan Mónaco in the third round after beating Sergiy Stakhovsky and Nikolay Davydenko in the respective first and second rounds. At the end of October he again qualified for an ATP tournament, this time at Montpellier. He defeated Robin Haase in the first round before falling to Nikolay Davydenko in the second round. He finished the year at No. 82, having made $318,805 in prize money in addition to a compiling a singles match record of 13–18.

2011
Zverev had a slow start to 2011, losing four matches in a row before capturing his first win of the season in Indian Wells, where he made the second round after defeating Matthew Ebden. He then lost another four matches in a row again, prior to his victory over Dudi Sela in the first round at the Serbia Open.

2012–2015
Zverev played mainly in tournaments either on the ATP Challenger Tour or the ITF Men's Circuit during this time.

2016: Shanghai Masters quarterfinal
In April 2016, Zverev won his first ATP Challenger singles title in over eight years at the Sarasota Open.

At the 2016 Shanghai Masters, the German defeated world No. 14 Nick Kyrgios in the second round. He then beat Marcel Granollers before losing a close match to world No. 1 Novak Djokovic in the quarterfinals.

Zverev got to the semifinals at the Swiss Indoors tournament in Basel after beating world No. 3 Stan Wawrinka.

2017: First Grand Slam quarterfinal, first seeding at a Grand Slam & cracking the top 30
Zverev started his 2017 season at the Brisbane International with a loss to Rafael Nadal in the second round, winning only two games. However, at the 2017 Australian Open, Zverev was able to reach the quarterfinals after defeating world No. 1 Andy Murray in the fourth round, marking the biggest accomplishment of his career to date. Zverev ultimately ended up losing to the eventual champion and 17th seed, Roger Federer in straight sets, ending his remarkable run. In Indian Wells he was the 29th seed, marking the first time he has been seeded in a Masters tournament and thus meaning he would get a bye into the second round. In the second round he faced former world No. 28 Joao Sousa and defeated him in straight sets, then faced 8th seed Dominic Thiem against whom he lost to in straight sets. At the 2017 Miami Open he was the 28th seed, again receiving a bye into the second round, but he lost to qualifier Jared Donaldson. Zverev made his 2nd ATP level final at the Geneva Open losing in 3 sets to Stan Wawrinka. He was seeded for the first time at a Grand Slam in Paris as the 32nd seed, but lost in the first round to the unseeded Stefano Napolitano. At the 2017 MercedesCup the home crowd saw him reach the semifinals, where he lost a close three setter to Feliciano Lopez. Then at the 2017 Gerry Weber Open he won against Lukas Lacko in straight sets, before losing in two close sets to eight time Halle champion Roger Federer. In Halle doubles action he would make his second final of the year, partnering his younger brother Alexander. At the 2017 Wimbledon Championships as the 27th seed Zverev reached the third round after beating Bernard Tomic and Mikhail Kukushkin.  By virtue of his Wimbledon showing, Mischa would move up to a career-best world No. 25 in the ATP rankings. As the 23rd seed, he made the fourth round at the next Grand Slam, the US Open.  Zverev would go on to finish the year ranked No. 33, improving 18 spots from his previous best finish in 2016.

2018: First ATP title

After pulling out of the first round of the Australian Open while trailing Hyeon Chung 6–2, 4–1, Zverev was fined a record $45,000 for an 'unprofessional first round performance', becoming the first player to be fined under the new rule. The fine represented nearly all of the prize money Zverev would have received for losing in the first round.

Zverev won his first career ATP title at the 2018 Eastbourne International, defeating Nicolás Jarry, seventh seed Steve Johnson, third seed Denis Shapovalov, Mikhail Kukushkin, and Lukáš Lacko.

Performance timelines

Singles
Current through the 2022 ATP Tour.

Doubles
Current through the 2022 ATP Tour.

ATP career finals

Singles: 3 (1 title, 2 runner-ups)

Doubles: 12 (4 titles, 8 runner-ups)

Team competition: 1 (1 runner-up)

ATP Challenger and ITF Futures finals

Singles: 16 (10–6)

Doubles: 25 (11–14)

Record against top-10 players
Zverev's match record against players who have been ranked in the Top 10, with those who are active in boldface. Includes only ATP Tour main draw matches.

Top 10 wins
He has a  record against players who were, at the time the match was played, ranked in the top 10.

Records
The following record was attained during the Open Era.

Notes

References

External links

 
 
 

1987 births
Living people
German expatriates in Monaco
German male tennis players
German people of Russian descent
Tennis players from Moscow
Russian emigrants to Germany
Naturalized citizens of Germany